is a Japanese football player.

Playing career
Takeshima was born in Chiba Prefecture on June 11, 1999. He joined J2 League club Ehime FC from JEF United Chiba youth team in 2018. On June 6, he debuted against Mito Hollyhock in Emperor's Cup.

References

External links

1999 births
Living people
Association football people from Chiba Prefecture
Japanese footballers
J2 League players
Ehime FC players
Association football midfielders